The Ipojuca River is a river of Pernambuco state in eastern Brazil.

See also
List of rivers of Pernambuco

References

Rivers of Pernambuco